CER was a series of early computers (based on vacuum tubes and transistors) developed by Mihajlo Pupin Institute in Yugoslavia in the 1960s and 1970s.

Models:
 CER-10 - 1960, based on vacuum tubes, transistors, electronic relays, and magnetic core memory. First Yugoslav digital computer (developed in "Vinca"-Institute) in (SFRY).
 CER-2 - 1963, a prototype model
 CER-20 - 1964, CER-30 - 1966, - the prototypes of the "electronic bookkeeping machine" for EI Niš and RIZ Zagreb;.
 CER-200 - 1966,  series of 18 "electronic bookkeeping computers".
 CER-202-1968; CER-203 - 1972
 CER-22 - 1967, based on transistors, MSI circuits, magnetic core memory, punched cards and magnetic disks. Serie of 3 electronic systems, used for on-line banking operations and data processing applications;
 CER-12 - 1971, "electronic computer for business data processing", based on VLSI technology, wire wrapping boards, magnetic disks and magnetic tapes;
 CER-11 - 1966, based on transistors, core memory, Teletype printer etc. Mobile military computer (used in the JNA (Yugoslav People's Army);
 CER-101 Kosmos - 1973, based on VLSI circuits, core memory, magnetic drum, paper tapes, Teletype printers; Mobile computer in special military vehicles (used in the JNA's V.T. Institute);
 CER-111 - 1975, Mobile military computer, based on VLSI technology, Hard disk drive; Used in JNA until 1989.

Models and types

CER-Computers Table (author: Dušan Hristović, M.P.Institute, Belgrade University); GFDL and CCSA 3.0 License.

See also
 History of computer hardware in Yugoslavia
 List of computer systems from Yugoslavia

References

 Rajko Tomović, A.Mandzić, T.Aleksić, P.Vrbavac, V.Masnikosa, D.Hristović i M. Marić: «CIFARSKI  ELEKTRONSKI RAČUNAR – CER INSTITUTA VINČA«, Zbornik V Konf. ETAN – 1960,tom 1, pp. 305–330, Beograd, 18. November 1960.
 Vukašin Masnikosa:«Aritmetički organ eksperiment.numeričke mašine u IBK-Vinča«, ELEKTROTEHNIKA,vol.8,No 8,pp.xx, Belgrade 1959.(takodje: ETAN-1958,pp. 303)
 Dušan Hristović,Branko Dokmanović:«Napajanje rač.mašine CER«, V Konf.ETAN-60, pp. 315–324, Belgrade 1960.
 Tihomir Aleksić,P.Vrbavac,J.Opačić: «Magnetno-tranzistorski brojački element i  njegova primena  u brojačima impulsa«,AUTOMATIKA i ELEKTRONIKA,vol.2,No4,Beograd 1962.
 B.Janković,N.Parezanović,S.Rajić,M.Marić:«Analiza jednotakt.prekid.sistema na univ. računarima«,Zbornik 8.Konf. ETAN-1963, tom 1,pp. 211–217, Zagreb,7.Sept.1963.
 Dušan Hristović: »Tranzistorski  izlazni pojačavači za feritne memorije«, Zbornik 8.Konf. ETAN-1963, tom 1, pp. 219–225, Zagreb, 7.September 1963.
 Nedeljko Parezanović: «Elektronski računar sa usvajanjem programa«, Zbornik 8.Konf.ETAN-1963,tom 1, pp. 199–204, Zagreb, 7.Sept. 1963.
 Veselin Potić:«Poluprom. memorija induktivnog tipa«, 9.Kon.ETAN-64,pp. 243–246, YU Bled .
 M.Hruška,M.Marić:”Pristupni sistem brze koincid.mem.vel.kapaciteta”,Zbornik 11.Konf.ETAN-67,tom 1,pp. 365–372, Niš 8.June 1967.
 Dušan Hristović: »Računar CER–22«, HPEEA journal, No 10, pp. 5–12, Belgrade, Oktober 1969.
 M.Momčilović,D.Hristović,P.Vrbavac et al.:»Domaći cifarski el. računari CER«, Zbornik Savetovanja:Mehanografija i AOP u preduzećima, pp. 38–58, YU Nova Varoš, 22.May 1969.
 Vladislav Paunović: »Jedno rešenje veze linijskog štampača«, časopis HPEEA, No 15, pp. 31–35,Belgrade, July 1970.
 Vladislav Paunović: »Aritmetička jedinica-AJ  računara CER-12«, AUTOMATIKA, No3, pp. 161–165, Zagreb, 1971.(v.takodje Konf.ETAN-1972,str.877-886, Velenje, June 1972.)
 Veselin Potić,M.Šavikin:«U/I sistem CER-12«,AUTOMATIKA,No 3, pp. 166–176,Zagreb,1971.
 M.Momčilović, Miladin Dabić:«Domaći el.sistem za obradu podataka CER-203« VI  jug.simpozium o automatizaciji obrade podataka, Zagreb, 1972.
 Dušan Hristović: »MP struktura  digitalnog  računara HRS 101«, AUTOMATIKA, No3, pp. 173–179, Zagreb, 1972.
 M.Šavikin,V.Potić,M.Timotić,A.Marjanski: «Podsistem čitača-bušača pap.trake u sklopu rač.sistema CER-12«,Zborn.16Kon.ETAN-1972,pp. 865–876, Velenje, June 1972.
 V.Potić,B.Tanasijević:«Organizacija i rešenje sistema memorije na magnetnom dobošu«,Zbornik 17.Konf.ETAN-1973, tom 2, pp. 1030–1035, Novi Sad, 6.June 1973.
 B. J. Kogan,P.Vrbavac et al.:«Gibr.VičislSistema GVS-100«, Sbornik IPU, Moskva 1974, pp. 5–42; Also:Proc.of the VII.Congress AICA-73, pp. 305–316, Prague 27. August 1973.
 Dušan Hristović,Borivoj Lazić: «Programsko testiranje eksternih memorija«, Zbornik 18.Konf.ETAN-1974,tom 2, pp. 1157–1166, Ulcinj 6. June 1974.
 Tihomir Aleksić:”Logička sinteza digitalnih sistema«,Naučna knjiga, Belgrade 1971.i 1975.(2 editions).
 Veselin Potić,i dr:«Programska detekcija kvarova u disk-memoriji«,Informatika-1974, YU Bled.
 Veselin Potić,Dušan Hristović:«Asocijativna struktura  za adresiranje spoljnih memorija«, AUTOMATIKA,No 5-6, pp. 181–185,Zagreb 1976.(also see: 20.Konf.ETAN-76, pp. 1127–1135,YU Opatija).
 Dušan Hristović: ”Interaktivni grafički terminali”,Zbornik ETAN-77,pp. 161–168,Banja Luka,6.June 1977.
 Tihomir Aleksić:»RAČUNARI-ORGANIZACIJA I ARHITEKTURA«,Naucna knjiga,Belgrade 1982,85,89.i 1991. (4 editions).
 Dragoljub Milićević,Dušan Hristović et al.: «RAČUNARI  TIM«, Naučna knjiga,Belgrade,1990. (pp. 163–169, see the photographs of the CER computers).
 Dušan Hristović: «Computer History,CER-10«, IT Star Newsletter, Vol.7, No.1, pp. 6–7, Spring issue 2009.
 B.Lazić, D.Živković,Ž.Tošić,M.Stojčev,D.Obradović,V.Kovačević:»50 GODINA RAČUNARSTVA«,Zbornik 39.Konf.ETRAN-95, tom 3,pp. 7–20, Zlatibor, 6.June 1995.
 D.Bečejski-Vujaklija,N.Marković(Ed):"50 Years of Computing in Serbia(50 Godina Računarstva u Srbiji)",pp. 11–44, DIS,IMP and PC Press,Belgrade 2011.
 Vladislav Paunović, Dušan Hristović: «PRIKAZ I ANALIZA RAČUNARA CER« Zbornik 44.Konf.ETRAN-2000,tom 3, pp. 79–82, Sokobanja, 26.June 2000.
 Dušan Hristović:"Razvoj Računarstva u Srbiji"(Development of the Computing Technology in Serbia), PHLOGISTON journal, No 18-19, pp. 89–105, Museum MNT-SANU, Belgrade 2010/2011.
 Jelica Protic et al.: "Building Computers in Serbia",ComSIS, vol.8, no 3, pp. 549–571, Belgrade June 2011.

CER computers
Mihajlo Pupin Institute